Claus Leininger (17 January 1931 – 22 February 2005) was a German stage director in theatre and opera, and an intendant (general manager). He shaped the artistic profile of the Musiktheater im Revier in Gelsenkirchen, nicknamed the Ruhr-Scala during his tenure, and the Hessisches Staatstheater Wiesbaden.

Career 
Born in Mannheim, Leininger studied acting and stage directing from 1950 to 1952. He was then engaged at the Nationaltheater Mannheim as an actor and Regieassistent (assistant director).

From 1967 to 1974, he was Oberspielleiter des Schauspiels, leading the play section of the Städtische Bühnen Essen, with Erich Schumacher as director. He held the same position at the Nationaltheater Mannheim until 1977. He was appointed Generalintendant (General Manager) of the Musiktheater im Revier in Gelsenkirchen on the recommendation of conductor Uwe Mund, and held the post until 1986. At the beginning of his tenure, he called the singer Carla Henius to form and direct the musik-theater-werkstatt (Music Theatre Workshop), which was devoted to the presentation of new operas. Leininger's time at the Musiktheater im Revier was described as an era and as the period of the company's highest artistic accomplishment. He built ensembles at both houses, opera and play, finding young talents who often moved on in their careers. He won  for a ballet that was also directed at children and young people. Occasionally, notable singers were invited as guests to make performances more attractive, including Grace Bumbry, Helen Donath, Mirella Freni, Johanna Meier, Birgit Nilsson, Katia Ricciarelli, Leonie Rysanek, Theo Adam, Giacomo Aragall, Peter Dvorsky, Manfred Jung, Kurt Moll, Karl Ridderbusch, and Ingvar Wixell. Alluding to the noted Italian opera house La Scala, the theater was nicknamed the Ruhr-Scala during Leininger's tenure, reflecting the upgrading of cultural offerings in what was essentially an industrial region along the Ruhr river.

When Leininger moved to the Hessisches Staatstheater Wiesbaden as Generalintendant in 1986, Henius followed and directed an institution for new operas there. He was Generalintendant until 1994.

Television 
 Draußen vor der Tür by Wolfgang Borchert, with Helmut Rost (TV direction), Klaus Abramowsky, Jens-Uwe Pape, Wolff Lindner, Rudolf Cornelius, Michael Enk, Rainer Pigulla, Christa Bernhardt, Werner Brunn, Wolfgang Hofmann, Ilse Anton, Eva Garg, Peter Hohberger, among others. Production: Städtische Bühnen Essen, ZDF.

References

External links 
 
 Claus Leininger – Nachruf obituary in Opernwelt

German theatre directors
German opera directors
People from Gelsenkirchen
People from Mannheim
1931 births
2005 deaths